Leaders of the various University of New South Wales student unions are listed below.

Students' Union presidents 
The following students served as president of the University of New South Wales Students' Union. The presidential term ran from 1 January to 31 December of each year. The office bearer's national faction affiliation is shown in brackets.
 1967 Chris Humphries
 1968 Ron Rigby 
 1969 John Geake 
 1972 Ed Quay
 1973 Phillip John Drummond (Independent)
 1974 John M. Green (Labour)
 1985 Peter Lynch (Independent)
 1986 Greg Moore (Independent)
 1987 John Sloman (Labor)
 1988 Paul Nicolau (Liberal)
 1989 Antony Sachs (Non-aligned Left/Labor)
 1990 Lawrence Hyde (Independent)
 1991 Mok Juang Yu (NOSCA: Network of Overseas Students Collective in Australia)
 1992 Jo Kaar (National Organisation of Labor Students)

Student Guild presidents 
The following students served as president of the University of New South Wales Student Guild of Undergraduates and Postgraduates. The presidential term ran from 1 January to 31 December of each year. The office bearer's national faction affiliation is shown in brackets.
 1993 Penny Sharpe (National Organisation of Labor Students)
 1994 Alex Hanlon (Non-Aligned Left/Labor)
 1995 Warwick Adams (National Organisation of Labor Students/Non-Aligned Left)
 1996 Rosemary Gibbs (National Organisation of Labor Students/Non-Aligned Left)
 1997 David Coleman (National Liaison Committee)
 1998 David Madden (National Liaison Committee)
 1999 Sen Tan (National Liaison Committee)
 2000 Nina Pham/Cameron Ball (National Liaison Committee)
 2001 David Boyd (National Broad Left/National Organisation of Labor Students)
 2002 Sam O'Leary (Student Unity)
 2003 Tony Butler (Student Unity)
 2004 Courtney Roche (Student Unity)
 2005 Manoj Dias-Abey (National Broad Left/National Organisation of Labor Students)
 2006 Xavier O'Halloran (National Labor Students)
Jesse Young (National Labor Students) was elected in 2006 to serve as Guild president in 2007. He became the founding president of the Arc Representative Council, which assumed the Guild's representative functions.

University Union presidents

COFASA presidents 
The following students served as president of the College of Fine Arts Students' Association. The presidential term ran from 1 January to 31 December of each year.
 ...
 2002 Monika Wheeler
 2003 Alacoque Dash
 2004 Renata Field
 2005 Julian Bradley
 2006 Stephen Mok

Footnotes 

University of New South Wales